Clivina bolivari is a species of ground beetle in the subfamily Scaritinae. It was described by Barr in 1967.

References

bolivari
Beetles described in 1967